Gum is a sap or other resinous material associated with certain species of the plant kingdom. This material is often polysaccharide-based and is most frequently associated with woody plants, particularly under the bark or as a seed coating. The polysaccharide material is typically of high molecular weight and most often highly hydrophilic or hydrocolloidal.

As seed coating
Many gums occur as seed coatings for plant species; the adaptive purpose of some of these gummy coatings is to delay germination of certain flora seeds. An example of such a gummy coating occurs in the case of Western poison oak, a widespread shrub in western North America.

See also
 Cambium
 Gummosis
 Latex
 Natural gum

Line notes

Plant physiology